Tillandsia pseudobaileyi subsp. yucatanensis is a subspecies of flowering plant in the genus Tillandsia. This subspecies is endemic to Mexico.

References

pseudobaileyi subsp. yucatanensis
Flora of Mexico
Plant subspecies